The Bounty (Chinese: 懸紅) is a 2012 action comedy film featuring the directorial debut of Fung Chi Keung  and starring Chapman To, Fiona Sit and Alex Man. In November, the film received the Hong Kong Film Development Fund's "Film Development Foundation Film Production Finance Project" to provide HK$2,605,711 of finance. This is the 13th film financed by The Hong Kong Film Development Fund.

Plot
With an optimistic attitude towards life, Cho Sai Fung (Chapman To) is a neurotic man with extraordinary skills, who relies on bounty hunting to make a living. This time he comes to an island, a small hotel called LAZY Inn, to hunt down a fugitive robber Lee Kin Fai, with a HK$4000,000 reward from the police. Suen Long Ching (Fiona Sit) is the innkeeper's (Alex Man) daughter. She has a rich imagination and curiosity, and is a little hyperactive. The nosy father and daughter have been monitoring the weird customer Cho, with the repeated wrong touch and misunderstanding, attracts a variety of funny jokes.

Cast
Chapman To as Cho Sai Fung
Fiona Sit as Suen Long Ching
Alex Man as Boss Suen
Zi Yi as Coconut Man / Lee Kin Fai
Zhang Jin as Yip On
Nai Mang @ RubberBand as Brother Cane
Charmaine Fong as News vendor
Wong Yik Lam
Eric Kot as Sergeant Chung
Raymond Wong Ho-yin as Mr. PTU
Wan Chiu as Tony
Sire Ma as Bride
Stephanie Cheng
6 Ho @ RubberBand
Law Wing-cheung
Michael Hui as Cho Sai Fung's bounty hunting mentor
Ngai San Hei as Judy
Jumbo Tsang as Belle
Wang Wang Chi as Muscleman
Lee Kin Hing 	  	 
Crystal Lau as Twin girl
Pang Chak Man as Twin girl
Jackie Leung as Passer-by
Szeto Lai Mui as Passer-by
Lam Yiu Kei Passer-by
Lee Chak Yuk as Passer-by
Liu Wing Ha as Passer-by
Chow Yun Cheung as Passer-by
Ng Kwok Ming as Passer-by
Koo Ming Kui as Passer-by
Lam Siu Mei as Passer-by
Chan Ho Ming as Passer-by
Lau Ka Yee as Passer-by
Leung Hing San as Passer-by

References

External links

The Bounty at Hong Kong Cinemagic

2012 films
2012 action comedy films
Hong Kong action comedy films
2010s Cantonese-language films
Films set in Hong Kong
Films shot in Hong Kong
2012 directorial debut films
2010s Hong Kong films